Arthur Bollard (1879−1919) was an Australian rugby league footballer who played in the 1900s and 1910s.  He played for North Sydney in the NSWRL competition and was a foundation player of the club.

Playing career
Bollard played in North Sydney's first ever season in 1908 which was also the first season of the NSWRL competition in Australia.  Bollard played 4 seasons for Norths and retired at the end of 1911.

Bollard also represented Australia and New South Wales on 2 occasions for both sides in 1909.

References

North Sydney Bears players
Rugby league players from Sydney
Rugby league second-rows
New South Wales rugby league team players
1879 births
1919 deaths
Australia national rugby league team players